Earl's Court is a district of Kensington in the Royal Borough of Kensington and Chelsea in West London, bordering the rail tracks of the West London line and District line that separate it from the ancient borough of Fulham to the west, the sub-districts of South Kensington to the east, Chelsea to the south and Kensington to the northeast. It lent its name to the now defunct eponymous pleasure grounds opened in 1887 followed by the pre–World War II Earls Court Exhibition Centre, as one of the country's largest indoor arenas and a popular concert venue, until its closure in 2014.

In practice, the notion of Earl's Court, which is geographically confined to the SW5 postal district, tends to apply beyond its boundary to parts of the neighbouring Fulham area with its SW6 and W14 postcodes to the west, and to adjacent streets in postcodes SW7, SW10 and W8 in Kensington and Chelsea.

Earl's Court is also an electoral ward of the local authority, Kensington and Chelsea London Borough Council. Its population at the 2011 census was 9,104.

History

Early history

Earl's Court was once a rural area, covered in orchards, green fields and market gardens. The Saxon Thegn Edwin held the lordship of the area prior to the Norman conquest. For over 500 years the land, part of the ancient manor of Kensington, was under the lordship of the de Vere family, the Earls of Oxford, descendants of Aubrey de Vere I, who held the manor of Geoffrey de Montbray, bishop of Coutances, according to the Domesday Book 1086. By circa 1095, his tenure had been converted, and he held Kensington directly from the crown. A church had been constructed there by 1104. The earls held their manorial court where the Old Manor Yard is now, just by Earl's Court tube station, eastern entrance. Earl's Court Farm is visible on Greenwood's map of London dated 1827.

The name Earl's Court likely came from the fact that for a long time the owners of the land were an old English noble family, the Rich family and they were the earls of Warwick. When Edward Henry Rich, 9th Baron Rich, 7th Earl of Warwick and 4th Earl of Holland died young in 1721, the assets including the Jacobean Holland House, passed by marriage to the Edwardes family.

19th century

The original catalyst for development was the ill-fated vanity project by Lord Kensington (died 1852), which consisted of the two-mile conversion of the insanitary Counter's Creek into the Kensington Canal (1826 onwards), followed by its eventual replacement first by  "Mr Punch's railway", opened in 1844 and next, by the Metropolitan District Railway in 1865–69, which eventually became London Underground's District Line and was joined after 1907 by the Piccadilly line. Meanwhile, the congestion apparent in London and Middlesex for burials at the start of the century was causing public concern not least on health grounds. In 1837 a decision was made to lay out a new burial ground on the edge of Earl's Court in an outlying area of Brompton. The moving spirit behind the project was the engineer, Stephen Geary. It was necessary to form a company in order to get parliamentary permission to raise capital for the proposal. Securing the land – some 40 acres – from local landowner Lord Kensington and the Equitable Gas Light Company, as well as raising the money, proved an extended challenge. After two years the cemetery was duly established by Act of Parliament and laid out in 1839, it opened in 1840, originally as the West of London and Westminster Cemetery. It was consecrated by Charles James Blomfield, Bishop of London, in June 1840, and is now one of Britain's oldest and most distinguished garden cemeteries, served by the adjacent West Brompton station.

In the quarter century after 1867, Earl's Court was transformed into a loosely populated Middlesex suburb and in the 1890s a more dense parish with 1,200 houses and two churches. Eardley Crescent and Kempsford Gardens were built between 1867 and 1873, building began in Earl's Court Square and Longridge Road in 1873, in Nevern Place in 1874, in Trebovir Road and Philbeach Gardens in 1876 and Nevern Square in 1880. Earl's Court's only hospital was opened in 1887 on the corner of Old Brompton Road and Finborough Road. It was named in honour of Queen Victoria's youngest daughter. The hospital closed in 1978.

Garden squares and mews

Earl's Court adds to the Royal Borough's tally of almost 50 garden squares. Within SW5 they include:

 Barkston Gardens
 Bina Gardens
 Bolton Gardens
 Bramham Gardens
 Collingham Gardens
 Courtfield Gardens
 Earl's Court Square
 Gledhow Gardens
 Nevern Square
 Philbeach Gardens
 Wetherby Gardens

The mews include:

 Courtfield Mews
 Dove Mews
 Farnell Mews
 Gasper Mews
 Hesper Mews
 Kramer Mews
 Laverton Mews
 Morton Mews
 Old Manor Yard
 Redfield Mews
 Spear Mews
 Wetherby Mews

20th century

For most of the century, Earl's Court was home to three notable institutions, all now gone. The first and indeed oldest school of its kind is the London Academy of Music and Dramatic Art founded in 1861. It was located on the corner of Cromwell Road and Earl's Court Road, until its move to the former Royal Ballet School in Talgarth Road. The next foundation dated 1892, was the London Electronics College (formerly the London School of Telegraphy), which was located at 20 Penywern Road and in its heyday did much to expand the use of Morse code throughout the world. Already in the 1990s it was threatened with closure as technology had moved on. It finally closed in 2017 having served as a further education college offering electronic engineering and IT courses. The third institution was the Poetry Society, founded in 1909 and housed at 21 Earl's Court Square. It decamped to new premises in the recently refurbished Covent Garden district of Central London in the 1990s.

Evidently, after WWI, Earl's Court had already acquired a slightly louche reputation if George Bernard Shaw is to be believed, see his Pygmalion. 
Following the Second World War a number of Polish officers, part of the Polish Resettlement Corps, who had fought alongside Allied  Forces, but were unable to return to their homeland under Soviet dominance (see Yalta Conference), opened small businesses and settled in the Earl's Court area leading to Earl's Court Road being dubbed the "Polish Corridor".

During the late 1960s a large transient population of Australian, New Zealand and white South African travellers began to use Earl's Court as a UK hub and over time it gained the name "Kangaroo Valley".

Population
The Earl's Court ward had a population of 9,104 according to the 2011 census.

The change in the area's population is largely owed to rocketing property prices and the continued gentrification of the area. The scale of change is illustrated by the economic divide between the eastern and western areas of Earl's Court. Despite fighting fiercely for the exhibition centre, according to Dave Hill in The Guardian, the area's economy has been destroyed by this imbalance and the destruction of the exhibition venue.

Notable people

Blue plaques
 Jenny Lind (1820–1887), Swedish opera singer and teacher lived in Boltons Place in the latter part of her life. A blue plaque at 189 Old Brompton Road, London, SW7, was put up in 1909.
 Edwin Arnold (1832–1904), English poet and journalist, lived at 31 Bolton Gardens.
 WS Gilbert (1838–1911), English dramatist and librettist, poet and illustrator, one of the two authors of the Savoy operas, lived in Harrington Gardens.
 Norman Lockyer (1836–1920), English scientist and astronomer credited with discovering the gas helium, lived at 16 Penywern Road
 Dame Ellen Terry (1847–1928), leading Shakespearian stage actress in Britain in the 1880s and 1890s, lived at 22 Barkston Gardens.
 Edmund Allenby, 1st Viscount Allenby (1861–1936), British soldier and administrator famous for his role during the First World War when he led the Egyptian Expeditionary Force in the conquest of Palestine and Syria, lived at 24 Wetherby Gardens.
 Beatrix Potter (1866–1943), English naturalist, children's author, grew up in Old Brompton Road. Hers is not a blue plaque, but a multicoloured plaque on the wall of Bousfield Primary School, near the spot where her house stood before it was bombed in the Second World War
 Howard Carter (1874–1939), English archaeologist, Egyptologist and primary discoverer of the tomb of Tutankhamun, lived at 19 Collingham Gardens.
 Sir William Orpen (1878–1931), Irish portrait painter, lived at 8 South Bolton Gardens.
 Agatha Christie (1890–1971), English creator of Hercule Poirot, lived in Cresswell Place
 Alfred Hitchcock (1899–1980), English filmmaker and producer, lived at 153 Cromwell Road
 Mervyn Peake (1911–1968), painter and author of written works, such as the Gormenghast trilogy, lived at 1 Drayton Gardens
 Benjamin Britten (1913–1976), English composer, conductor, violist and pianist, lived at 173 Cromwell Road.
 Hattie Jacques (1922–1980), English comedy actress of stage, radio and screen including the Carry On films, lived at 67 Eardley Crescent. In November 1995 a blue plaque was unveiled at this house by Eric Sykes and Clive Dunn, who was a colleague from her Players' Theatre days.
 Willie Rushton (1937–1996), English satirist, cartoonist, co-founder of Private Eye, and much else, lived in Wallgrave Road.

Other notable residents
 William Edwardes, 2nd Baron Kensington (1777–1852), Irish peer and British Member of parliament, original developer of the Edwardes estate, where part of Earl's Court now stands. The family originated in Pembrokeshire which accounts for Earl's Court street names such as, Nevern, Penywern and Philbeach etc.
 Augustus Henry Lane-Fox (Pitt Rivers) (1827–1900), Yorkshire-born army officer, ethnologist and archaeologist lived in 19-21 Penywern Road with 11 servants from 1879 to 1881 when he inherited a vast fortune that enabled him to upgrade to Grosvenor Gardens, London, on condition he adopted the surname, Pitt Rivers. He is the founder of the Pitt Rivers Museum in Oxford.
 Major Sir William Palliser (1830–1882), Irish-born politician and inventor, Member of Parliament for Taunton from 1880 to his death, lived in Earl's Court Square.
 Sir Robert Gunter (1831–1905), army officer, confectioner, developer and MP and his Yorkshire ancestry left their stamp on the area not merely as builders of the huge Gunter estate, but by conferring so many West Riding of Yorkshire names through part of Earl's Court, i.e. Barkston, Bramham, Collingham, Wetherby, Knaresborough etc.
 Howard Spensley (1834–1902), Australian lawyer and British Liberal politician, lived in Earl's Court Square.
 William Butler Yeats (1865–1939), Irish poet and pillar of the literary establishment, Nobel Prize winner lived at 58 Eardley Crescent during 1887 when he returned to London with his parents. His mother suffered several strokes that year.
 Horace Donisthorpe (1870–1951), English myrmecologist and coleopterist, lived at 58 Kensington Mansions, Trebovir Road. Memorable for championing the renaming of the genus Lasius after him as Donisthorpea, and for discovering new species of beetles and ants, he is often considered the greatest figure in British myrmecology.
 H. G. Pelissier (1874–1913), English theatrical producer, composer and satirist, lived at 1 Nevern Square.
 Adelaide Hall (1901–1993) American jazz singer and entertainer lived at 1 Collingham Road with her husband Bert Hicks.
 Stewart Granger (1913–1993), British actor, was born in Coleherne Court, Old Brompton Road, and spent most of his childhood there.
 Ninette de Valois (1898–2001), founder of The Sadler's Wells, later The Royal Ballet, lived in Earl's Court Square.
 Jennifer Ware (1932–2019), social activist co-founder of the Earl's Court Society among other local bodies, dubbed "The Mother of Earl's Court".
 Dusty Springfield (1939–1999), popular British singer and record producer, once lived in Spear Mews.
 Syd Barrett (1946–2006) English, of Pink Floyd lived at 29 Wetherby Mansions, Earl's Court Square, from December 1968 to some time in the 1970s.
 Diana, Princess of Wales (1961–1997), member of the British Royal Family, and the first wife of King Charles III, lived at 60 Coleherne Court, Old Brompton Road, from 1979 to 1981.
Sophie, Countess of Wessex (born 1965), like Princess Diana lived in Coleherne Court.
 Michael Gove (born 1967), British Conservative Party politician.
 Tara Palmer-Tomkinson (1971–2017), English socialite and 90s It Girl lived (and died) in a flat in Bramham Gardens.

Alumni of St Cuthbert's and St Matthias School
 Michael Morpurgo (born 1943), English author, poet and playwright
 Rita Ora (born 1990), Kosovo-born British singer and actress

Film locations and novels

 Beatrix Potter's most famous work, Peter Rabbit was written in her childhood home in Bolton Gardens.  The nearby Brompton Cemetery's tomb stones are said to have inspired the names of some of her much loved characters.
 No. 36 Courtfield Gardens was used in the Alvin Rakoff 1958 film Passport to Shame (aka Room 43).
 Kensington Mansions, on the north side of Trebovir Road, was the mysterious mansion block in Roman Polanski's movie Repulsion (1965), in which the sexually repressed Carole Ledoux (played by Catherine Deneuve) has a murderous breakdown. The film won the Silver Berlin Bear-Extraordinary Jury Prize at the Berlin Film Festival later the same year. Kensington Mansions Block 5 featured in an episode of TV crime drama New Tricks.
 Part of the Italian film Fumo di Londra (internationally released as Smoke Over London and Gray Flannels, 1966) was shot on Redcliff Gardens. Alberto Sordi, who wrote, directed and starred in the film, won the David di Donatello for best actor. The soundtrack by Italian maestro Piero Piccioni is one of his best known.
 64 Redcliffe Square is featured in An American Werewolf in London (1981). The film is a horror/comedy about two American tourists in Yorkshire who are attacked by a werewolf that none of the locals admit exists. The flat in the square belongs to Alex (Jenny Agutter), a pretty young nurse who becomes infatuated with one of the two American college students (David Kessler), who is being treated in hospital in London.
 Earl's Court was the setting for the 1941 novel Hangover Square: A Tale of Darkest Earl's Court by novelist and playwright Patrick Hamilton. Often cited as Hamilton's finest work, it is set in 1939 in the days before war is declared with Germany. The hero George Harvey Bone innocently longs for a beautiful but cruel woman called Netta in the dark smoky pubs of Earl's Court, all the while drowning himself in beer, whisky and gin.
 Several scenes of the 1972 film Straight on Till Morning were filmed in and around Hogarth Road.
 Part of the 1985 BBC film To the World's End was shot in Earl's Court. It documented the people and the neighbourhoods along the journey of the No. 31 London bus from Camden Town to World's End, Chelsea.
 The 2006 film Basic Instinct 2 used 15 Collingham Gardens for a party scene.
 Bolton Gardens was depicted in the 2006 film Miss Potter starring Renée Zellweger
 26 Courtfield Gardens was mentioned in Richard Curtis' film About Time (2013) and was filmed on location for one of party scenes.
 The 2018 David Hare series Collateral starring Carey Mulligan and Billy Piper filmed in Bramham Gardens which was used as the home of Piper's character.
 A house in Earl's Court Square was filmed for the Grand Designs 2019 House of the Year upon its nomination by the Royal Institute of British Architects.
 In season 2 of the BBC America's Killing Eve, the exterior shot of a hotel is filmed on the corner of Cromwell Road and Collingham Road; on the boundary of Earl's Court and South Kensington.
 Season 4 of The Crown (2020) filmed outside Princess Diana's former flat in Coleherne Court.
 The reality TV show Made in Chelsea has filmed in the garden square of Courtfield Gardens (West).
Glam rock icon David Bowie filmed the video for his 1979 hit single "D.J." off of the Lodger album here, during which he walks down the street and attracts a crowd of people—many of whom start  following him—some running up to him and kissing him or whispering things in his ear—as he lip synchs the lyrics. The video was directed by David Mallet.

Local attractions

Earl's Court may be within walking distance of High Street Kensington, Holland Park, Kensington Gardens/Hyde Park, the Royal Albert Hall, Imperial College, the Natural History, Science and Victoria and Albert Museums.

Original gaiety

The introduction of two Underground stations, and a mass network of railways trapped a triangle of land on the border of the original parishes of Kensington and Fulham. After an unsuccessful attempt to build a Catholic school on the site, the idea of expanding entertainment in the area was probably inspired by the existence of the Lillie Bridge Grounds popular sports facility, just inside the Fulham boundary, next to West Brompton station. The person who was to bring it to fruition was John Robinson Whitley, an entrepreneur from Leeds who used the land as a show-ground for a number of years from 1887. Whitley did not meet with business success, but his aspirations for Earl's Court took hold for others to fulfil.

In 1895 the Great Wheel, a Ferris wheel, was created for the international impresario, Imre Kiralfy's Empire of India Exhibition. A plaque in the former Earls Court venue commemorated some of these events and that the reclusive Queen Victoria was an occasional visitor to the many shows put on at the site. In 1897 Kiralfy had the Empress Hall built to seat 6,000 in neighbouring Fulham and he had the Earl's Court grounds converted into the style of the 1893 Chicago White City for the Columbian Exposition. More was to come.

Not until 1937 was the Earls Court Exhibition Centre opened, with its striking Art Moderne façade facing Warwick Road. A new entrance to Earl's Court tube station was constructed to facilitate easy access to the Exhibition Centre, including direct entrance from the underground passage which connects the District and Piccadilly lines. This was however closed in the 1980s at around the time the capacity of the Exhibition Centre was expanded by the construction of a second exhibition hall, Earl's Court 2, which was opened by Princess Diana, herself a former Earl's Court resident.

In its heyday the Earls Court Exhibition Centre hosted many of the leading national trade fairs, including the annual British International Motor Show (1937-1976) and Royal Smithfield Show, as well as Crufts dog show and the combined forces Royal Tournament, which gave its name to the public house (now demolished) on the corner of Eardley Crescent. The biggest trade fairs migrated to the National Exhibition Centre at Birmingham Airport when it opened in 1988. The longest-running annual show was the Ideal Home Show in April, which attracted tens of thousands of visitors. Otherwise, it was increasingly used as a live music venue, hosting events such as the farewell concert by the boy-band Take That. At the other end of the scale, it was also used for arena-style opera performances of Carmen and Aida. Archive Movietone newsreel footage (which can be seen on YouTube) captures a unique and powerful rehearsal of the Berlin Philharmonic Orchestra under Wilhelm Furtwängler playing the end of Brahms' Fourth Symphony during a post-war reconciliation visit to London.

Other highlights
The Prince of Teck is a Grade II listed pub at Earl's Court Road.

A located in the Earl's Court Road, is a nursery and garden shop backing onto Pembroke Square where most of the signs, especially for spring bulbs, are still hand-written and knowledgeable staff mingle with the customers.

An early 1940s and 50s Bohemian haunt in the Earl's Court Road was the café, el Cubano, which had piped music and an authentic Italian steam coffee machine, a rarity in those days. It was few doors down from the bakery, Beaton's, whose only other outlet was on the King's Road, Chelsea. Also from that era was the theatre club, Bolton's that in 1955 transformed into arthouse cinema, the Paris Pullman in Drayton Gardens.

The Troubadour is a coffee house and a small music venue, which has hosted emerging talent since 1954 – including Bob Dylan, Jimi Hendrix and Elvis Costello.

The Drayton Arms is a Grade II listed public house at 153 Old Brompton Road, which is also a theatrical venue.

The Finborough Theatre, which opened in 1980, is the neighbourhood's local theatre.

Earl's Court Village is the centre of the British Filipino community, with a number of restaurants (including the UK's first Jollibee location), supermarkets (many of which also serve take-away food) and banks.

The area also has a police box of the type used for the TARDIS time machine in the BBC Television series Doctor Who. The blue police box located outside Earl's Court underground station in Earl's Court Road is actually a replica of the traditional GPO police telephone boxes that were once a common sight in the UK from the early 1920s.

Neighbourhoods

East Earl's Court

"East Earl's Court" lies to the south of Cromwell Road and to the east of Earl's Court Road (a main north–south artery which bisects Earl's Court) and is home to many multimillion-pound flats and houses in smart garden squares and residential streets. The southern boundary of Earl's Court is Old Brompton Road, with the area to the west being West Brompton, and the area to the south east being the Beach area of Chelsea. Here, (based on sale prices per square foot), the Boltons, has some of the most costly real estate in Europe. Houses in the Boltons have sold for up to £20 million. The eastern boundary of Earl's Court is Collingham Gardens and Collingham Road, east of which is South Kensington.

West Earl's Court
"West Earl's Court", lying to the west of Earl's Court Road, is notably different in architecture. White stucco fronted "boutique" hotels in Trebovir Road and Templeton Place, and the impressive late-Victorian mansion flats and town houses of Earl's Court Square, Nevern Square and Kensington Mansions

Architecture

There are some examples of early- to mid-Victorian architecture in the Earl's Court ward. Gardens such as Bramham Gardens and Courtfield Gardens are traditional residential squares with many properties fronting onto them and in the case of Courtfield Gardens, traditional cast iron railings around the enclosed gardens have been restored (the originals having been removed on the orders of the MoD (UK) in 1940 for munitions during the Second World War) creating a more authentic Victorian ambience.

Further west, Kensington Mansions, Nevern Square and Philbeach Gardens are built around impressive formal garden settings (access limited to key holding residents). Collingham Road and Harrington Road, also have some unique buildings, many of them used as embassies. A little further north, just south of the Cromwell Road, the conservation area comprising Childs Place, Kenway Road, Wallgrave Road and Redfield Lane contains fine examples of more terraced townhouses. Hidden in the middle of this area is London's smallest communal garden, "Providence Patch" built on the site of former stables serving the surrounding houses, which were destroyed by a German bomb in 1941.  A glimpse of the (private) gardens can be seen via the original stable entrance way in Wallgrave Road

Gay area

Earl's Court preceded Soho and Vauxhall as London's premier centre of gay nightlife, though the number of businesses aimed mostly at gay men has dwindled to a single retail outlet, as Soho and Vauxhall established themselves as the new focus.  The first public nightclub aimed at a gay clientele, the Copacabana, opened in Earl's Court Road in the late 1970s, but was re-themed as a general venue in the late 1990s.  The bar upstairs, Harpoon Louie's (later Harpo's and later still Banana Max), was until the late 1980s among the most popular gay bars in London. It is now a Jollibee restaurant.

The oldest pub on the site was the Lord Ranelagh pub (opposite the former Princess Beatrice Hospital) now demolished, that in 1964 spearheaded the local demand for live entertainment. A young, non-gay, male band, the Downtowners, attracted considerable attention. They persuaded many of the local cross-dressers to come into the pub and perform. Thus, the Queen of the Month contest was born. Every Saturday night the pub was packed to capacity. The show ran from September 1964 until May 1965 when the News of the World ran an article entitled 'This show must not go on'. On that Sunday night the pub was so packed that every table and chair had to be removed. Crowds spilled out on to the pavement onto Old Brompton Road. The police closed the show. Many well-known celebrities were among the clientele and the Lord Ranelagh, in its incarnations as Bromptons and finally, Infinity, is considered to have played a role in the history of gay liberation. In the 1970s it became a notorious leather bar, with blacked-out windows, attracting an international crowd including the likes of Freddie Mercury, Kenny Everett, and Rudolf Nureyev. The pub underwent several different incarnations as a gay nightclub, the last as "Infinity", and after its closure, it was squatted, demolished and turned into yet another "local" outlet of a near-global grocery chain.

The Pembroke pub, formerly the Coleherne, dates from the 1880s and had a long history of attracting a bohemian clientele before becoming known as a gay pub. A lifelong resident of Earl's Court Square and social activist, Jennifer Ware, recollects as a child being taken there to Sunday lunch in the 1930s, when drag entertainers performed after lunch had finished. It also became infamous as the stalking ground for three separate serial killers from the 1970s to the 1990s: Dennis Nilsen, Michael Lupo and Colin Ireland. It sought to lighten its image with a makeover in the mid-1990s to attract a wider clientele; to no avail, as in December 2008 it underwent a major refurbishment and repositioned itself as a gastro pub with a new name.

Transport

Tube stations

 Earl's Court tube station, served by the District and Piccadilly lines
 West Brompton station, served by the District line's Wimbledon branch and London Overground
 Gloucester Road tube station, served by the Circle, District and Piccadilly lines

Bus routes
328, 430, 74, C1, C3.

These have replaced the former routes 31 that used to run from World's End to Kilburn and the old bus route 74B that ran from Hammersmith to London Zoo.

Major roads
When Ernest Marples was transport minister (1962-1964), it was decided to turn part of Earl's Court Road, from the junction with Pembroke Road, into a southward one-way arterial road and the parallel Warwick Road as the northward arterial road, going past the then Earl's Court Exhibition Centre.
A third arterial road at right angles to the former two is the Cromwell Road, designated as the A4 that carries traffic between central London and Heathrow Airport and beyond to the West.
A fourth road that creates a box with the other three is the A 3218, Old Brompton Road, better described as a trunk road.

Nearby places

Brompton Cemetery, Grade I Listed
Stamford Bridge, home of Chelsea F.C.
Olympia Exhibition Centre, West Kensington

Districts
Chelsea
South Kensington
West Brompton
West Kensington
Fulham

References

Bibliography
 Tames, Richard. Earl's Court and Brompton Past. London: Historical Publications. . 2000
AA Illustrated Guide to Britain, Basingstoke, Hampshire, 5th edition, 1983, p. 240-1.

 
Districts of the Royal Borough of Kensington and Chelsea
Areas of London
Ethnic enclaves in the United Kingdom
Places formerly in Middlesex
Rich family
District centres of London